Teddy Thompson is the self-titled, debut album by singer-songwriter Teddy Thompson, son of Richard and Linda Thompson. The album was released under Virgin Records on August 29, 2000. Friend and fellow singer-songwriter Rufus Wainwright contributes backing vocals on "So Easy" and co-wrote "Missing Children".

Track listing
 "Wake Up"
 "Love Her For That"
 "Brink of Love"
 "So Easy"
 "All I See"
 "All We Said"
 "A Step Behind"
 "Missing Children"
 "Thanks a Lot"
 "Days in the Park"
Hidden Track: "I Wonder if I Care as Much" (The Everly Brothers) with Emmylou Harris

Personnel
 Judith Owen – backing vocals (track: 1)
 Rufus Wainwright – backing vocals (track: 4)
 Sally Dworsky – backing vocals (tracks: 3, 6)
 Jennifer Condos – bass
 Curt Bisquera – drums, percussion
 Chris Bruce – guitar (tracks: 4, 7), 
 Greg Leisz – guitar (tracks: 5, 6, 8, 10), 
 Gregg Arreguin – guitar (track: 1)
 Jon Brion – guitar (tracks: 6, 7)
 Randy Jacobs – guitar (tracks: 2, 3, 9)
 Richard Thompson – guitar (tracks: 1, 2, 5, 6, 10)
 Jamie Muhoberac – keyboards
 Teddy Thompson – vocals, acoustic guitar, harmonium
 Emmylou Harris – vocals (hidden track)

References

2000 debut albums
Teddy Thompson albums
Albums produced by Joe Henry
Virgin Records albums